The 2021 Notre Dame Fighting Irish football team represented the University of Notre Dame in the 2021 NCAA Division I FBS football season. The team was led during the regular season by Brian Kelly in his 12th and final season at Notre Dame. The Fighting Irish played their home games at Notre Dame Stadium in South Bend, Indiana, and compete as an independent.

On November 29, Kelly resigned to become the head coach at LSU. He finished at Notre Dame with a 12-year record of 113–40 on the field, and an official record of 92–40 due to games vacated by the National Collegiate Athletic Association (NCAA). Marcus Freeman was named the program's new head coach. The Irish played in the  Fiesta Bowl against Oklahoma State. They would lose 37-35 after blowing a 28-7 lead in the 2nd quarter.

Previous season
In a season limited due to the ongoing COVID-19 pandemic, the Fighting Irish finished the 2020 season 10–2. They received a bid to the semifinal of the College Football Playoff as the No. 4 seed. In the Rose Bowl, which was held at AT&T Stadium in Arlington, Texas, to allow fans to attend the game, they lost to eventual national champion Alabama. They finished the season ranked No. 5 in the AP poll.

Offseason

Coaching changes
On December 14, 2020 defensive coordinator Clark Lea left the school to become the head coach at Vanderbilt. On January 8, 2021, the school named Cincinnati defensive coordinator Marcus Freeman to replace Lea.

Departures
NFL
 OL Liam Eichenberg (drafted by the Miami Dolphins)
 OL Aaron Banks (drafted by the San Francisco 49ers)
 LB Jeremiah Owusu-Koramoah (drafted by the Cleveland Browns)
 TE Tommy Tremble (drafted by the Carolina Panthers)
 OL Robert Hainsey (drafted by the Tampa Bay Buccaneers)
 QB Ian Book (drafted by the New Orleans Saints)
 DL Daelin Hayes (drafted by the Baltimore Ravens)
 DL Adetokunbo Ogundeji (drafted by the Atlanta Falcons)
 WR Ben Skowronek (drafted by the Los Angeles Rams)
 S Shaun Crawford (signed by the Las Vegas Raiders)
 OL Tommy Kraemer (signed by the Detroit Lions)
 CB Nick McCloud (signed by the Buffalo Bills)
 WR Javon McKinley (signed by the Detroit Lions)
 TE Brock Wright (signed by the Detroit Lions)
Transfers out
 RB/WR Kendall Abdur-Rahman (transferred to Western Kentucky)
 RB/WR Jafar Armstrong (Transferred to Illinois)
 WR Jay Brunelle (transferred to Yale)
 DT Ja'Mion Franklin (Transferred to Duke)
 OL Dillan Gibbons (transferred to Florida State)
 C Colin Grunhard (Transferred to Kansas)
 LB Jordan Genmark Heath (Transferred to UCLA)
 WR Jordan Johnson (transferred to UCF)
 WR Micah Jones (Transferred to Illinois State)
 LB Jack Lamb (Transferred to Colorado)
 DE Ovie Oghoufo (Transferred to Texas)
 CB Isaiah Rutherford (Transferred to Arizona)
 RB Jahmir Smith (Transferred to Appalachian State)
 DE Kofi Wardlow (Transferred to Charlotte)
Other
 OL Hunter Spears (medically retired from football)

Transfers in
 QB Jack Coan (transferred from Wisconsin)
 OL Cain Madden (transferred from Marshall)
 LB Adam Shibley (transferred from Michigan)

Schedule
The 2021 schedule was officially released on April 25, 2019. The neutral site game at Soldier Field had been designated the Shamrock Series game, although television rights were owned and operated by the Big Ten Network. This was the second year since 2020 that not every home game aired on NBC, as the home opener aired on Peacock.

Rankings

Personnel

Game summaries

at Florida State

Toledo

Purdue

vs. No. 18 Wisconsin

For this season's Shamrock Series, Notre Dame kept with tradition by donning special uniforms. The team wore its usual gold helmet that featured four stars on the back of the helmet, which honors the Flag of Chicago. The school's blue uniform had sleeves featuring two gold stripes, which resemble the rivers and waterways represented on Chicago's flag. The all-white numbers are block slab-serif, which represent the "City of Broad Shoulders". The back collar of the uniform displays Notre Dame's mission statement, which is to "Graduate Champions". The pants are a nod to the Fighting Irish team that played the first football game at Soldier Field in 1924, the same year the university won its first championship. The pants are gold, with two blue lines with a white line in the middle, running down the side of the leg. 

With this victory, Brian Kelly became the winningest coach in Notre Dame history with victory  number 106, surpassing Knute Rockne in his 12th season with the Fighting Irish.

No. 7 Cincinnati

at Virginia Tech

USC

North Carolina

Navy

at Virginia

Georgia Tech

at Stanford

vs. Oklahoma State (Fiesta Bowl)

References

Notre Dame
Notre Dame Fighting Irish football seasons
Notre Dame Fighting Irish football